QC Ware is a quantum-computing-as-a-service company based in Palo Alto, California.

History
QC Ware was founded in 2014 by Matt Johnson, KJ Sham, and Randall Correll after Johnson met a group of researchers at NASA Ames interested in quantum computing.

In 2018, QC Ware was one of the first testers of Google's Cirq framework, publicly demonstrating an implementation of the QAOA algorithm on a simulator.

Services
In 2019, QC Ware launched Forge, a cloud platform that aims to allow developers to run algorithms on hardware provided by multiple vendors.  As of the launch, the platform offered access to a D-Wave quantum computer, but only simulations of Google and IBM machines.

Q2B conference
QC Ware hosts an annual practical quantum computing conference.  The first Q2B was hosted in 2017.

References

Software companies based in California
Cloud computing providers
Technology companies based in the San Francisco Bay Area
Software companies of the United States
American companies established in 2014
Software companies established in 2014
2014 establishments in California